The Gnessin State Musical College and Gnesins Russian Academy of Music is a prominent music school in Moscow, Russia.

History

Originally known as the Gnessin Institute, it was established on February 15, 1895 by three sisters: Evgenia Fabianovna, Elena Fabianovna, and Maria Fabianovna Gnessin. Each of the Gnessin sisters had studied piano and graduated with distinction from the Moscow Conservatory. Construction of the modern building began in 1937, interrupted during the war and resumed in 1943. The main part of the academy was built in 1946.

The college quickly became, and remains, an elite music school, considered second only to the Moscow Conservatory.

Founders
The Gnessin sisters were born in Rostov-on-Don, the children of Rostov Rabbi Fabian Osipovich Gnessin. The entire family appears to have possessed musical talent. Their brother, Mikhail Fabianovich Gnessin, was a celebrated composer and teacher who later served (1945–1957) as head of Gnessin State Musical College.

Alumni
Russian unless otherwise stated

 Georgy Andryushchenko, opera singer
 Alexey Arhipovsky, balalaika virtuoso
 Yulianna Avdeeva, pianist
 Rim Banna, Palestinian singer, composer and arranger
 Nikolay Baskov, singer
 Sonya Belousova, Russian-American composer, pianist and recording artist
 Dmitry Belosselskiy, bass
 Evgeny Belyaev, singer
 Boris Berezovsky, pianist
 Vasilisa Berzhanskaya, opera singer
 Dima Bilan, singer and Eurovision winner
 Artyom Bogucharsky, actor and clarinetist
 Ivan S. Bukreev, singer
 Roberto Cani, violinist
 Marina Devyatova, singer
 Egine, Armenian-Russian singer and songwriter
 Boris Elkis, composer
 Ivan Farmakovsky, jazz pianist and composer
 Alexander Goldstein, composer
 Alina Ibragimova, violinist
 Dimitri Illarionov, guitarist
 Alexander Ivashkin, cellist
 Eugene Izotov, oboist
 Mungonzazal Janshindulam, Mongolian pianist
 Sati Kazanova, singer
 Yakov Kazyansky, composer and jazz pianist
 Leonid Kharitonov, singer
 Philipp Kirkorov, singer and actor
 Evgeny Kissin, pianist
 Dmitry Shishkin, pianist
 Lev Knipper, composer
 Alexander Knyazev, cellist
 Joseph Kobzon, Russian vocalist
 Maria Krushevskaya, Russian harpist
 Elena Kuznetsova, pianist and teacher
 Edward M. Labkovsky, singer
 Irina Lankova, Belgian pianist
 Alexander Levine, Russian-British composer 
 Konstantin Lifschitz, pianist
 Oleg Maisenberg, pianist
 Alexander Malofeev, pianist
 Maxim Mironov, tenor
 Roman Moiseyev, conductor
 Sofia Moshevich, Canadian scholar, pianist, and teacher
 Quynh Nguyen, Vietnamese pianist
 Boris Parsadanian, Armenian-Estonian composer
 Olga Pashchenko, pianist
 Alla Pavlova, American composer
 Kirill Rodin, cellist
 Vadim L. Ruslanov, singer
 Alexei T. Sergeev, singer
 Prokhor Shalyapin, singer
 Konstantin Shamray, pianist
 Vissarion Shebalin, composer
 Natalia Sheludiakova, Russian-Australian pianist and teacher
 Anatoly Sheludyakov, pianist
 Vladimir Shkaptsov, singer
 Vladislav Shoot, composer
 Alexander S. Sibirtsev, singer
 Leonid Sigal, violinist
 Senya Son, pianist and composer
 Viktor Suslin, composer
 Evgeny Svetlanov, conductor
 Svoy, Russian-American songwriter/producer
 Mikael Tariverdiev, Georgian-Armenian composer
 Valentina Tolkunova, singer
 Daniil Trifonov, pianist
 Pava Turtygina, composer and pianist
 Yulia Volkova, singer from the group t.A.T.u.
 Aleksey Volodin, pianist
 Marina Yakhlakova, pianist
 Inna Zhvanetskaya, Ukrainian composer
 Igor Zubkovsky, cellist
 Elena Kats-Chernin, composer

Faculty

 Timofei Dokschitzer, Russian-Ukrainian trumpeter
 Mikhail Fikhtengoltz, violinist
 Grigori Gamburg, conductor
 Mikhail Gnessin, composer and brother of founding sisters
 Maria Grinberg, Russian-Ukrainian pianist
 Aram Khachaturian, Armenian composer
 Alexander Kobrin, pianist
 Volodymyr Kozhukhar, conductor
 Ivan Mozgovenko, clarinetist
 Nelli Shkolnikova, Russian-Australian violinist and teacher
 Natalia Shpiller, opera singer
 Lyubov Streicher, composer and violinist
 Inna Abramovna Zhvanetskaia, composer
 Valentine Yanovna Zhubinskaya, pianist and composer

References

External links
Gnesin Academy of Music official website (Russian)
Gnessin State Musical College website (Russian)

 
Music schools in Russia
Universities and colleges in Moscow
Education in Moscow
Culture in Moscow
Arbat District